The Théâtre National Algérien Mahieddine Bachtarzi, formerly known as the Algiers Opera House, is a historic building in Algiers, Algeria. It was built from 1850 to 1853. It was designed by architects Charles Frédéric Chassériau and Justin Ponsard in the Baroque Revival style. After it caught fire in 1883, it was rebuilt from the ground up.

See also
 Algiers Opera House

References

External links
Official website

Buildings and structures completed in 1853
Buildings and structures in Algiers
Baroque Revival architecture in Algeria
Opera houses in Algeria
Theatres in Algeria
1853 establishments in Africa